John LaGale Horton (April 30, 1925 – November 5, 1960) was an American singer-songwriter and musician. Initially performing traditional country, Horton later performed rockabilly songs. He is best known for a series of history-inspired narrative country saga songs that became international hits. His 1959 single "The Battle of New Orleans" was awarded the 1960 Grammy Award for Best Country & Western Recording. The song was awarded the Grammy Hall of Fame Award and in 2001 ranked No. 333 of the Recording Industry Association of America's "Songs of the Century". His first No. 1 country song was in 1959, "When It's Springtime in Alaska (It's Forty Below)".

He had two successes in 1960 with both "Sink the Bismarck" and "North to Alaska," the latter used over the opening credits to the John Wayne film of the same name. Horton died in November 1960 at the peak of his fame in a traffic collision, less than two years after his breakthrough. Horton is a member of the Rockabilly Hall of Fame and the Louisiana Music Hall of Fame.

Early life
Horton was born in Los Angeles, the youngest of the five children of the former Ella Claudia Robinson (1892-1966) and John Loly Horton (1889–1959), and raised in Rusk in Cherokee County in East Texas. His family often traveled between east Texas and southern California to work as migrant farm workers. After he graduated from high school in Gallatin, Texas, in 1944, Horton attended Lon Morris Junior College in Jacksonville, Texas, on a basketball scholarship. He later attended Seattle University and briefly Baylor University in Waco, although he did not graduate from any of these institutions.

Horton soon returned to California and got a job in the mail room at Selznick International Pictures, where his future wife, Donna Cook, was working in the studio as a secretary. After a short stint studying geology in Seattle in 1948, Horton went to Alaska to look for gold. During this period he began writing songs. Returning south, he entered and won a talent contest in Henderson, Texas. Encouraged by this result, he returned to California to pursue a music career.

His guest appearances on Cliffie Stone's Hometown Jamboree on KXLA-AM and KLAC-TV in Pasadena and his own half-hour show The Singing Fisherman led to the opportunity to record some songs on the Cormac record label. By the time the company folded in 1952, Horton recorded 10 singles for that label. Fabor Robison, owner of Abbott Records, acquired the master recordings. Around that time, Horton married Donna Cook.

Louisiana Hayride and early career
By this time Horton was appearing regularly on Louisiana Hayride, so he and Donna moved to Shreveport, Louisiana, where the show was recorded. He also signed a contract with Mercury Records and began recording. His first song for that label, "First Train Headin' South" b/w "(I Wished for an Angel) The Devil Sent Me You" (Mercury 6412), received good reviews. He and his new backup band, the Rowley Trio, began touring under the name The Singing Fisherman and the Rowley Trio in 1952, eventually changing the name to Johnny Horton and the Roadrunners. The group included Horton as lead singer and Jerry Rowley on fiddle as well Rowley's wife Evelyn on piano and his sister Vera (Dido) on guitars. The constant touring was hard on Horton's marriage, and Donna moved back to Los Angeles. They were soon divorced.

On September 26, 1953, Horton married Billie Jean Jones, widow of Hank Williams, who had died on January 1, 1953. Horton parted ways with the Rowley trio but continued to appear occasionally on Louisiana Hayride. His contract with Mercury expired in late 1954, with his recording of "All for the Love of a Girl" (Mercury 70227) being his bestseller, at 35,000 to 45,000 copies. Horton, himself always an avid fisherman, got a job in a tackle shop and put his music career on hiatus. But by the following year, his new manager and bassist Tillman Franks had obtained Horton a one-year contract with Columbia Records. They traveled to Nashville in a borrowed car for their first recording session. Influenced by the work of Elvis Presley, Horton began adopting a more rockabilly style.

"Honky-Tonk Man" and later career
"Honky-Tonk Man" was recorded on January 11, 1956, at the Bradley Film & Recording Studios in Nashville, one of four songs Horton recorded that day. Session musicians on the recording were Grady Martin and Harold Bradley, as well as Bill Black (at the time Presley's bassist). Soon afterwards "Honky-Tonk Man" was released as a single (Columbia label: 4–21504) paired with another song from the same session, "I'm Ready if You're Willing". They went out on tour, with the band featuring Franks on bass and Tommy Tomlinson on guitar.

"Honky-Tonk Man" was reviewed by the March 10 issue of Billboard, which said, "The wine women and song attractions exert a powerful hold on the singer, he admits. The funky sound and pounding beat in the backing suggest the kind of atmosphere he describes. A very good jukebox record." Their review of "I'm Ready if You're Willing" was also positive: "Horton sings out this cheerful material with amiable personality. This ever more popular stylist ought to expand his circle of fans with this one." The song peaked at No. 9 on the C&W Jockey chart (now Hot Country Songs) and at No. 14 on the Best Seller chart.

Horton returned to the studio on May 23, but the "A" side of his next single, "I'm a One Woman Man" (Columbia 21538), was one of the songs recorded back in January. The "B" side was "I Don't Like I Did". Billboard described "One Woman Man" as a "smart and polished job," and Horton as "singing with a light, airy touch. Guitar work is just as convincing, adding up to listenable, commercial stuff". He and his band toured through the United States and Canada to promote the record, which reached No. 7 on the Jockey chart and No. 9 on the Best Seller and Jukebox charts.

"I'm Coming Home" / "I Got A Hole In My Pirogue" (Columbia 40813) was released around this time as well. On February 9, Billboard noted that "not only Southern markets are doing good business with this, but Northern cities report that both country and pop customers are going for this in a big way". It was again a success on the country charts (No. 11 Jockey, No. 15 Best Seller) but it failed to score the popular music charts.

Later major successes include the song "The Battle of New Orleans" (written by Jimmy Driftwood), which was awarded the 1960 Grammy Award for Best Country & Western Recording. The song was awarded the Grammy Hall of Fame Award and in 2001 ranked No. 333 of the Recording Industry Association of America's "Songs of the Century". Horton had two other successes in 1960 with "Sink the Bismarck" and "North to Alaska" for John Wayne's movie, North to Alaska.

Death

On the night of November 4–5, 1960, Horton and two other band members, Tommy Tomlinson and Tillman Franks, were traveling from the Skyline Club in Austin, Texas, to Shreveport when they collided with an oncoming truck on a bridge near Milano in Milam County, Texas. Horton died en route to the hospital, and Tomlinson (1930–1982) was seriously injured; his leg later had to be amputated. Franks (1920–2006) suffered head injuries, and James Davis, the driver of the truck, had a broken ankle and other minor injuries.

The funeral was held in Shreveport on November 8, 1960, officiated by Tillman Franks' younger brother, William Derrel "Billy" Franks, a Church of God minister. Johnny Cash did one of the readings, choosing Chapter 20 from the Gospel of John. Horton is interred at Hillcrest Memorial Park and Mausoleum in Haughton, east of Bossier City in northwestern Louisiana.

Legacy
When Johnny Cash, a good friend of Horton's, learned about the accident he said, "[I] locked myself in one of the hotel's barrooms and cried." Cash dedicated his rendition of "When It's Springtime in Alaska (It's Forty Below)" to Horton on his album Personal File: "Johnny Horton was a good old friend of mine." Over time, Horton's material has been re-released a number of times, through boxsets and compilations.

Horton was inducted into The Louisiana Music Hall of Fame and posthumously inducted into the Delta Music Museum Hall of Fame in Ferriday, Louisiana.

Some racist songs by Johnny Rebel have sometimes been incorrectly associated with Horton. Rebel did not begin recording until after Horton's death. The mistake is apparently because Horton recorded the historical song "Johnny Reb".

Personal life
Horton was married twice. His first marriage, to Donna Cook, ended with a divorce granted in Rusk, Texas. In September 1953 he married Billie Jean Jones, the widow of country-music singer Hank Williams (Williams' second wife). Billie Jean and Horton had two daughters, Yanina (Nina) and Melody, and Horton adopted Billie Jean's daughter Jeri Lynn.

Discography

Albums

Singles

Notes

References

External links
 Johnny Horton at Texas State Historical Association
 Rockabillyhall.com
 RCS-discography.com
 Rockabilly.nl
 
 

1925 births
1960 deaths
Abbott Records artists
American country singer-songwriters
American rockabilly guitarists
American male singer-songwriters
Columbia Records artists
Dot Records artists
Grammy Award winners
Lon Morris College alumni
Mercury Records artists
People from Rusk, Texas
Musicians from Shreveport, Louisiana
Road incident deaths in Texas
20th-century American singers
Accidental deaths in Texas
Burials in Louisiana
Singer-songwriters from Texas
Singer-songwriters from California
Singer-songwriters from Louisiana
Country musicians from California
Country musicians from Texas
Country musicians from Louisiana
20th-century American male singers
American country guitarists
American male guitarists
American acoustic guitarists
Guitarists from Texas
Guitarists from Louisiana
Guitarists from Los Angeles